The Energy Reorganization Act of 1974 (codified at 42 U.S.C.A. § 5801) is a United States federal law that established the Nuclear Regulatory Commission. Under the Atomic Energy Act of 1954, a single agency, the U.S. Atomic Energy Commission, had responsibility for the development and production of nuclear weapons and for both the development and the safety regulation of the civilian uses of nuclear materials. The Act of 1974 split these functions, assigning to the Energy Research and Development Administration (now the United States Department of Energy) the responsibility for the development and production of nuclear weapons, promotion of nuclear power, and other energy-related work, and assigning to the NRC the regulatory work, which does not include regulation of defense nuclear facilities. The Act of 1974 gave the Commission its collegial structure and established its major offices.

A later amendment to the Act also provided protections for employees, whistleblowers, who raise nuclear safety concerns.  Whistleblowers who believe they suffered retaliation for their protected activities have to file a written complaint with the United States Department of Labor (DOL) within 180 days of the first notice of the adverse action.  The whistleblowers would later have a choice to have their claim heard by a DOL administrative law judge or to file a lawsuit in court and seek a trial to a judge or jury.

External links
Information from the Nuclear Regulatory Commission
 Public Employees for Environmental Responsibility (PEER)
 Government Accountability Project
 Project On Government Oversight (POGO)
 National Whistleblower Center
 Workplace Fairness FAQ for environmental whistleblowers
 Tate & Renner article on whistleblowers under U.S. federal law
 Whistleblower Employee Protection Website
 U.S. Department of Labor Whistleblower Program & information

1974 in law
93rd United States Congress
Nuclear Regulatory Commission
United States federal energy legislation
United States federal environmental legislation
United States federal government administration legislation
1974 in the environment